Dumbrăvița may refer to the following places:

Romania
 Dumbrăvița, Brașov, a commune in Brașov County
 Dumbrăvița, Maramureș, a commune in Maramureș County
 Dumbrăvița, Timiș, a commune in Timiș County
 Dumbrăvița, a village in Ceru-Băcăinți Commune, Alba County
 Dumbrăvița, a village in Bârzava, Arad Commune, Arad County
 Dumbrăvița, a village in Holod, Bihor Commune, Bihor County
 Dumbrăvița, a village in Spermezeu Commune, Bistrița-Năsăud County
 Dumbrăvița, a village in Ibănești, Botoșani Commune, Botoșani County
 Dumbrăvița, a village in Ilia, Hunedoara Commune, Hunedoara County
 Dumbrăvița, a village in Ruginoasa, Iași Commune, Iași County
 Dumbrăvița, a village in Husnicioara Commune, Mehedinți County
 Dumbrăvița, a village in Vadu Moldovei Commune, Suceava County
 Dumbrăvița de Codru, a village in Șoimi Commune, Bihor County
 Dumbrăvița, a tributary of the Crișul Alb in Arad County
 Dumbrăvița (Ilișua), a tributary of the Ilișua in Bistrița-Năsăud County

Moldova
Dumbrăvița, Sîngerei, a commune in Sîngerei district

See also
 
 Dumbrava (disambiguation)
 Dumbrăveni (disambiguation)